Phyllonorycter bartolomella is a moth of the family Gracillariidae. It is endemic to the Canary Islands and is known from Gran Canaria and Tenerife.

Ecology
The larvae feed on Teline canariensis. They mine the leaves of their host plant. The mine starts epidermally and develops into an upper-surface, whitish and transparent tentiform mine without folds. Normally, the mine does not reach the base nor the tip of the leaflet. Pupation takes place within the mine, either in the base or in the tip of the leaflet.

References

bartolomella
Moths of Africa
Endemic insects of the Canary Islands
Moths described in 1968